William Albert "Thunder" Thornton (September 20, 1939 – December 18, 2008) was an American football fullback who played college football for the Nebraska Cornhuskers  (1960–1962) and professional football for the St. Louis Cardinals (1963–1965, 1967).  Thornton also coached at University of Nebraska, University of Missouri, and the St. Louis Football Cardinals.

Early years
A native of Toledo, Ohio, he attended Libbey High School in Toledo, graduating in 1959.  Thornton participated in football, basketball, and track at Libbey.  Thornton was recruited by numerous colleges but chose Nebraska over offers from Ohio State and other Big 10 and Mid-American conference schools.

College football career
Thornton played college football as a “two-way player” as a fullback and linebacker at Nebraska from 1960 to 1962.

Thornton was selected by the Associated Press as a first-team fullback on the 1961 All-Big Eight Conference football team after his junior season. Thornton also earned Honorable Mention All-American from the Associated Press for the 1961 season.

A pre-season separated shoulder injury shortened Thornton’s 1962 senior season at Nebraska.  However, he still was a Husker co-captain, garnered Honorable Mention All-Big 8 and played in the post-season East-West Shrine All-Star game in San Francisco.

University of Nebraska honor
During his senior year at the University of Nebraska, Thornton was inducted into the prestigious Innocent’s Society, which is the University of Nebraska chancellor’s club that honors outstanding seniors for their academic and leadership abilities.  Thornton was the first black inductee into the Society.

Professional football playing career
Thornton was drafted by the St. Louis Cardinals with the 58th pick (5th round) in the 1963 NFL Draft. He played for the Cardinals from 1963 to 1965 and in 1967, appearing in 47 NFL games.

College Coaching career
Hired in 1969 as a University of Nebraska football graduate assistant by then coach Bob Devaney, Thornton was promoted in 1970 to be the first black coach in the history of the University of Nebraska football program.  Thornton coached at Nebraska from 1969 until early 1972. During his three-year stint as a coach with the Huskers, Nebraska won 3 Big 8 Conference titles and two (1970 and 1971) national championships.

In 1978, Thornton was hired as the running backs coach for the Missouri Tigers football team under head coach Warren Powers.  Thornton coached the running backs at Missouri from 1978 until 1982.  During that period, Missouri advanced to four bowl games (1978 Liberty Bowl, 1979 Hall of Fame Classic, 1980 Liberty Bowl, and 1981 Tangerine Bowl).

Professional Coaching career
In March 1972, immediately after the Cornhuskers 1971 National Championship season, Thornton left Nebraska and was hired as the running backs coach for the NFL's St. Louis Cardinals.  Thornton was the first black coach ever hired by the NFL Cardinals franchise. Thornton held that role for just 5 months until resigning just before the start of the 1972 NFL season.

Later years
After retiring from coaching, Thornton worked for 16 years for the State of Missouri. He died in 2008 in Columbia, Missouri, of complications from diabetes.

References

1939 births
2008 deaths
American football fullbacks
St. Louis Cardinals (football) players
Nebraska Cornhuskers football players
Sportspeople from Toledo, Ohio
Players of American football from Ohio
Deaths from diabetes
Nebraska Cornhuskers football coaches
Missouri Tigers football coaches
St. Louis Cardinals (football) coaches